John Soule may refer to:

John B. L. Soule (1815–1891), American poet, preacher, and newspaperman, active in Indiana and Illinois
John P. Soule  (1828–1904), American photographer and publisher, active in Massachusetts and Washington state